West Derby is a Liverpool City Council ward within the Liverpool West Derby Parliamentary constituency. It was formed for the 2004 Municipal elections comprising most of the pre-2004 Croxteth ward, incorporating small parts of Gilmoss and Broadgreen wards.

It is centred on West Derby village and incorporates Blackmoor Park Junior school, St. Paul's primary school, St. Mary's primary school and Holly Lodge secondary school.

Councillors
The ward has returned seven Councillors

 indicates seat up for re-election after boundary changes.

 indicates seat up for re-election.

 indicates change in affiliation.

 indicates seat up for re-election after casual vacancy.

Election results

Elections of the 2020s

Elections of the 2010s

Elections of the 2000s

After the boundary change of 2004 the whole of Liverpool City Council faced election. Three Councillors were returned at this election.

See also
 Liverpool City Council
 Liverpool City Council elections 1880–present
 Liverpool Town Council elections 1835 - 1879

References

External links
 Liverpool City Council: Ward profile

Wards of Liverpool